Misterton may refer to:

Misterton, Leicestershire
Misterton, Nottinghamshire
centre of the former Misterton Rural District
contains Misterton Carr, a fenland area
Misterton, Somerset